The Street Swingers is an album by jazz trombonist and pianist Bob Brookmeyer with guitarists Jim Hall and Jimmy Raney, recorded in late 1957 for the World Pacific label.

Reception

The AllMusic review by Scott Yanow stated that "the tunes are fairly basic and all of the cool-toned musicians are up-to-par on the lightly swinging material."

Track listing
 "Arrowhead" (Jim Hall) - 8:59
 "Street Swingers" (Bob Brookmeyer) - 6:20
 "Hot Buttered Noodling" (Jimmy Raney) - 6:01
 "Musicale du Jour" (Brookmeyer) - 8:49
 "Raney Day" (Hall) - 5:24
 "Jupiter" (Raney) - 5:06

Personnel 
Bob Brookmeyer - valve trombone, piano
Jim Hall, Jimmy Raney - guitar
Bill Crow - bass
Osie Johnson - drums

References 

1958 albums
Bob Brookmeyer albums
Jim Hall (musician) albums
Jimmy Raney albums
World Pacific Records albums